Bethanie Mattek-Sands and Lucie Šafářová were the defending champions, but neither player could participate this year due to injury.

Chan Yung-jan and Martina Hingis won the title, defeating Tímea Babos and Andrea Hlaváčková in the final, 6–1, 6–4.

Seeds
The top four seeds received a bye into the second round.

Draw

Finals

Top half

Bottom half

References
 Main Draw

Womens Doubles